"Sunday Street" is the first single released from Squeeze's ninth album, Play. Although the song was never a hit, the single's B-side, "Maidstone," remains extremely popular among fans and was a frequent live request. "Maidstone" was even included on the 1996 Squeeze compilation Excess Moderation, while "Sunday Street" has not appeared on any compilation album to date.

Track listing

7" vinyl and cassette
 "Sunday Street" (4:19)
 "Maidstone" (3:35)

12" vinyl and CD
 "Sunday Street" (4:19)
 "Maidstone" (3:35)
 "Mood Swings" (3:02)

External links
Squeeze discography at Squeezenet

Squeeze (band) songs
1991 singles
Songs written by Glenn Tilbrook
Songs written by Chris Difford
1991 songs
Reprise Records singles